Adholokam is a 1988 Indian Malayalam film, directed by Thevalakkara Chellappan. The film stars Jagathy Sreekumar, Nedumudi Venu, Parijat and Thiagarajan in the lead roles. The film has musical score by Raveendran.

Cast
Jagathy Sreekumar
Nedumudi Venu as Peter
Parijat
Thiagarajan

Soundtrack
The music was composed by Raveendran and the lyrics were written by Balu Kiriyath.

References

External links
 

1988 films
1980s Malayalam-language films
Films directed by Thevalakkara Chellappan